A list of films produced in Hong Kong in 1985:

1985

References

External links
 IMDb list of Hong Kong films of 1985
 Hong Kong films of 1985 at HKcinemamagic.com

1985
Lists of 1985 films by country or language
1985 in Hong Kong